Xi’an Gaoxin No.1 High School was established in 1995. It is located in the middle of Xi'an High-tech Industries Development Zone. Under Gaoxin No.1 High School, there are 3 middle schools and 2 high schools. There are around 6000 students and 400 teachers and staff members in the school.

External links
official website (Chinese)

High schools in Shaanxi
Educational institutions established in 1995
1995 establishments in China
Schools in Xi'an